The Musical Courier was a weekly 19th- and 20th-century American music trade magazine that began publication in 1880.

The publication included editorials, obituaries, announcements, scholarly articles and investigatory writing about musical instruments and music in general. These included "construction practices, descriptions, tools, exhibitions and collections, new technologies, and laws and legal actions" relating to the music industry. There were articles on "companies and manufacturers of instruments, . . . entries on patents, trade marks, and designs for new or improved instruments",  as well as reporting on "African-American music and culture, women's rights, John Philip Sousa, Antonín Dvořák and the influence of the rise of Nazi Germany on music in Europe."

In 1897, Marc A. Blumenberg, the publisher, "separated the musical and industrial departments" of the magazine and began publishing the Musical Courier Extra "strictly as a trade edition."

In the 1890s, a separate edition was published in England. Composer, pianist, opera librettist, and music critic Leonard Liebling served as the publication's editor-in-chief from 1911–1945.

Former University of Southern California professor Lisa Roma, an operatic soprano, acquired it in 1958. She was the publisher and owner from 1958 to 1961. The magazine ceased publication 1962.

References

External links

Music magazines published in the United States
Weekly magazines published in the United States
Defunct magazines published in the United States
Magazines established in 1880
Magazines disestablished in 1962
Professional and trade magazines
Magazines published in New York City